Ambia catalaianus is a moth in the family Crambidae. It was described by Viette in 1954. It is found in Madagascar.

References

Moths described in 1954
Musotiminae
Moths of Madagascar